Matilda (1091 in Rethel – 1151) was the countess of Rethel from 1124 until 1151. 

She was a daughter of Count Hugh I and Melisende of Crécy.  In 1124, she succeeded her brother Gervais as countess.  She ruled jointly with her husband, Odo of Vitry.

Matilda and Odo had a son, Ithier (1115-1171), who succeeded Odo as count.

References

Sources

1091 births
1151 deaths
People from Rethel
12th-century French people
Counts of Rethel
12th-century women rulers